Agnibaan (Agni - Fire, Baan - Arrow, lit. Arrow of fire), produced by Agnikul Cosmos in Chennai, India, is a mobile launch system currently under development. It is capable of placing a 100 kg (220 lb) satellite into a 700 km (430 mi) orbit. The rocket will be 18 meters long with a diameter of 1.3 meters and a lift-off mass of 14,000 kg (31,000 lb). The rocket is supposed to be manufactured by 3D printing as a whole. The Agnibaan rocket has three stages. The first stage is powered by seven Agnilet engines. The second stage is powered by the same Agnilet engine which will have a larger nozzle than the sea level nozzle to optimize it for vacuum.

Engines 
Agnibaan will use clustered engines on the first stage in various configurations depending upon the payload. It will also use a vacuum optimized version of the Agnilet in the second stage. These engines use liquid oxygen and Kerosene as its oxidizer and fuel. The first stage of the Agnibaan is powered by 7 Agnite engines, each with a thrust of 25 kN (yet to be tested) at sea level.

These are all electric-pump-fed engines allowing for simplified engine design and highly configurable engine clustering architectures. It is capable of operating with a sea-level Isp of 285 seconds. The entire combustion section is a single-piece assembly and is fully 3D printed. The second stage of the vehicle also uses an Agnilet engine optimized for vacuum use. It is thought to deliver up to 355 seconds of Isp in a vacuum. An optional infant stage sits inside the payload fairing.]]

Launch site 
It is being built keeping in mind the capability to launch from multiple launch ports across the world. "Dhanush" - the launch pedestal is being designed to support full mobility across all configurations of Agnibaan. As opposed to (current versions of) Agnibaan, Dhanush is meant for reusability. Dimensions of Dhanush are designed keeping in mind road dimensions and transportability restrictions globally.

Schedule 
The company previously aimed to develop and launch its first rocket in 2021. A Non-Disclosure Agreement (NDA) was signed with the Department of Space to obtain the government's technological assistance in the development of launch vehicles on 3 December 2020. Although, the company entered an agreement with Alaska Aerospace Corp. to launch a rocket from Kodiak Launch Complex as a commercial launch pad to test rockets was not available in India. "We are planning to test launch our rocket Agnibaan before 2022 end. Our plan is to launch the rocket from a mobile launch pad. The test launch will happen from India's rocket port Sriharikota belonging to Indian Space Research Organisation (ISRO)", said Srinath Ravichandran, Co-founder and CEO, Agnikul Cosmos. No rocket was launched in 2022.

See also 
AgniKul Cosmos
Vikram 1
Skyroot Aerospace
Indian Space Research Organisation
Small-lift launch vehicle

References 

Spacecraft
Space launch vehicles of India
Vehicles introduced in 2022